Daniil Dmitrievich Markov (born 21 April 2000) is a Russian competitive swimmer. As a member of preliminaries relays he won three medals at the 2021 World Short Course Championships and two medals across the 2019 and 2021 European Short Course Championships. In the 50 metre freestyle, he won the bronze medal at the 2019 Summer Universiade and the silver medal at the 2018 Summer Youth Olympics. In the 50 metre butterfly, he won the silver medal at the 2018 Summer Youth Olympics and the bronze medal at the 2018 European Junior Swimming Championships. He is a former world junior record holder in the 4×100 metre medley relay.

Background
Markov was born 21 April 2000 in Russia.

Career

2018

2018 European Junior Championships

At the 2018 European Junior Swimming Championships in Helsinki, Finland in July, Markov swam a personal best time in the 100 metres of freestyle he swam leading off the 4×100 metre freestyle relay in the prelims on day one of competition, 4 July, with a time of 49.44 seconds. In the final of the event later the same day, he helped the finals relay team achieve a gold-medal-winning time of 3:18.21 by splitting a 50.12 for the lead-off leg of the relay. In the final of the 50 metre butterfly during the same finals session as the 4×100 metre freestyle relay final, Markov won the bronze medal with a time of 23.77 seconds, finishing just 0.21 seconds behind gold medalist Andrei Minakov, also of Russia, and 0.09 seconds after silver medalist Tomoe Hvas of Norway. Markov won his third and final medal of the Championships on the last day of competition, anchoring the 4×100 metre medley relay with a time of 49.45 seconds for his 100 metre portion of freestyle and finishing the relay at a time of 3:35.58 to win the gold medal along with relay teammates Kliment Kolesnikov, Vladislav Gerasimenko, and Andrei Minakov.

2018 Swimming World Cup: Kazan
Gaining addition racing experience after the European Junior Championships and before the 2018 Summer Youth Olympics, Markov competed at the 2018 Swimming World Cup stop in Kazan at the Palace of Water Sports and conducted in long course metres. In the prelims heats of the 50 metre freestyle, Markov qualified for the final ranking eighth with a time of 23.10 seconds. In the final, he swam the 50 metres of freestyle in 23.11 seconds to place eighth. For the 4×100 metre freestyle relay the next day, Markov split 50.54 seconds for the second leg of the relay, helping it achieve a time of 3:30.94 and win the silver medal in the event.

2018 Summer Youth Olympics

On the first day of the 2018 Summer Youth Olympics in Buenos Aires, Argentina, Markov won his first gold medal in the 4×100 metre mixed freestyle relay for his efforts in the prelims heats, where he swam a 50.28 for the lead-off leg of the relay to qualify the relay to the final ranked eighth. For his next event, the 100 metre butterfly, Markov swam a personal best time of 53.91 seconds in the prelims heats before placing 13th overall in the semifinals with a time of 54.07 seconds. Day three of competition, Markov ranked first in the semifinals of the 50 metre freestyle with a time of 22.30 seconds and qualified for the final. Following his semifinals performance, Markov won a gold medal in the 4×100 metre freestyle relay with finals relay members Kliment Kolesnikov, Vladislav Gerasimenko, and Andrei Minakov in a time of 3:18.11. On day four, Markov won his first individual medal of the Youth Olympic Games in the 50 metre freestyle, placing second and winning the silver medal in a time of 22.37 seconds, which was just 0.04 seconds slower than gold medalist Thomas Ceccon of Italy. Later in the day, Markov won a gold medal and set a world junior record in the 4×100 metre medley relay at 3:35.17, splitting a 49.19 for the freestyle leg of the relay.

The fifth day of competition, Markov won a silver medal in the 50 metre butterfly, finishing second with a time of 23.63 seconds, which was 0.01 seconds behind gold medalist Andrei Minakov and a time Tomoe Hvas tied by finishing at the exact same time, resulting in both Markov and Tomoe Hvas earning silver medals. Earlier on day five he competed in the 100 metre freestyle prelims heats, placing seventh overall with a time of 50.60 seconds, qualifying for the semifinals and choosing to withdraw from competition following the prelims stage of competition. On the sixth and final day, Markov competed in his eighth event and won his sixth medal, contributing to the silver medal win in the 4×100 metre mixed medley relay by swimming the butterfly leg of the relay in the prelims and helping qualify the relay to the final ranked third, he won a silver medal when the finals relay finished second in a time of 3:51.46.

2019

2019 World University Games
On 4 July 2019, at the 2019 World University Games conducted at Piscina Felice Scandone in Naples, Italy, Markov ranked sixth in the semifinals of the 50 metre butterfly with a time of 23.78 seconds, qualifying for the final the next day. In the final of the 50 metre butterfly on 5 July, he placed sixth with a time of 23.91 seconds. Four days later, Markov tied for eighth placed in the semifinals of the 50 metre freestyle and had to compete in a swim-off where he and the person he tied, Cameron Kidd of Canada, raced each other and the faster swimmer, Markov with a time of 22.23 seconds, qualified for the final of the event. Come the final of the event the following day, 10 July, Markov won the bronze medal in the event with a time of 22.39 seconds.

2019 European Short Course Championships

At the Tollcross International Swimming Centre in Glasgow, Scotland on 4 December for the 2019 European Short Course Swimming Championships, Markov swum the second leg of the 4×50 metre freestyle relay in a time of 21.36 seconds in the prelims heats, helping advance the relay to the final of the event ranking first at 1:25.07. When the Russia finals relay, which did not include Markov, finished first in the final of the event with a time of 1:22.92, all the Russia relay team swimmers in the prelims and the final won a gold medal for their contributions to the win.

2021

2021 Swimming World Cup: Kazan

On the first day of the 2021 Swimming World Cup stop in Kazan, 28 October, Markov qualified for the final of the 50 metre freestyle ranked sixth with a time of 21.51 seconds from the prelims heats. In the final of the 50 metre freestyle the same day, he placed fifth in 21.40 seconds. The next day, Markov swam a personal best time of 47.18 seconds in the prelims heats of the 100 metre freestyle, advancing to the final of the event ranked sixth. For the final he placed eighth, finishing in a time of 47.81 seconds. Later in the same finals session, Markov led-off the 4×50 metre mixed freestyle relay in a time of 21.62 seconds in the final to help attain a gold medal victory in a time of 1:33.73. Day three, the final day of competition, Markov advanced to the final of the 50 metre butterfly with his time of 22.87 seconds in the prelims heats. Markov placed fourth in the final, swimming a time of 22.57 seconds and finishing less than a quarter of a second behind the bronze medalist in the event, Kyle Chalmers of Australia. In his final event, Markov won a silver medal in the final of the 4×50 metre mixed medley relay, splitting a time of 21.30 seconds for the freestyle leg of the relay to contribute to the total time of 1:40.83.

2021 European Short Course Championships

In the prelims of the 4×50 metre medley relay event at the 2021 European Short Course Swimming Championships in Kazan, Markov split a 22.48 for the butterfly leg of the relay, helping qualify the Russia relay to the final ranked first with a time of 1:32.69. For the finals relay, Vladimir Morozov substituted in for Markov for the butterfly leg and when the finals relay placed second with a time of 1:30.79 all prelims and finals relay team members, including Markov, won a silver medal for their efforts.

2021 World Short Course Championships

Markov was one of the athletes named to the Russia national team for the 2021 World Short Course Championships in Abu Dhabi, United Arab Emirates in December. He and the other members of the team competed using the name Russian Swimming Federation per FINA choice as part of an ongoing Court of Arbitration for Sport ban on Russians not allowing them to use their country name, anthem, and flag at World Championships between 17 December 2020 and 16 December 2022.

In the preliminary heats of the 4×100 metre freestyle relay on day one, Markov split a 47.00 to help qualify the relay to the final ranked first with relay teammates Andrei Minakov, Vladimir Morozov, and Aleksandr Shchegolev. The finals relay, which did not include Markov, placed first and Markov won a gold medal for his prelims contributions. The next day, in the morning prelims session, he split a 21.30 for the second leg of the 4×50 metre mixed freestyle relay, qualifying the relay for the final ranked first with the help of his prelims relay teammates. On the finals relay, Vladimir Morozov substituted in for him and all prelims and finals relay members won the bronze medal when the finals relay finished third in 1:28.97. Day three of competition, he ranked 14th in the prelims heats of the 50 metre freestyle with a time of 21.50 seconds, qualifying for the semifinals in the evening. In the semifinals in the evening, he swam a personal best time of 21.33 seconds, ranked tenth overall, and did not advance to the final of the event. On the fourth day of competition, he split a 21.47 for the second leg of the 4×50 metre freestyle relay in the prelims heats, helping advance the relay tied in rank for first with the relay team from Italy with a time of 1:24.95. For the finals relay, Markov was substituted out, Andrei Minakov substituted in, and the relay won the silver medal in a time of 1:23.75.

2022: Double international ban for being Russian
Further competition by Markov on the international circuit in 2022 was shut down first by LEN, then by FINA, with each governing body blanket banning all Russians and Belarusians in response to the 2022 Russian invasion of Ukraine to publicly demonstrate and document their favoritism of Ukraine over Russia and Belarus.

Fighting to keep his national competition career alive, Markov competed at the 2022 Russian Championships held in April at the Palace of Water Sports in Kazan, setting a new personal best time of 21.94 seconds in the long course 50 metre freestyle. At the same Championships, he achieved a personal best time of 21.85 seconds in the final of the 50 metre freestyle, where he won the silver medal, and a personal best time of 49.01 in the 100 metre freestyle for the lead-off leg of the 4×100 metre freestyle relay where he placed fourth. His efforts were not acknowledged by FINA as counting towards their world rankings and world records as the organization also decided to not count times swam by Russians at any competition during the time period they enacted their ban.

Deciding to continue competing nationally, Markov won the silver medal in the short course 50 metre freestyle at the 2022 Russian Solidarity Games on 23 November swimming competition segment in November, finishing in a time of 21.24 seconds after achieving a personal best time of 21.19 seconds in the semifinals on 22 November. In the 100 metre freestyle final three days later, he placed sixth with a personal best time of 47.16 seconds.

International championships (50 m)

 Markov swam only in the preliminaries.

International championships (25 m)

 Markov swam only in the preliminaries.
 Markov was not a relay member on the finals relay that was disqualified.

Personal best times

Long course metres (50 m pool)

Legend: h – heat; r – relay 1st leg

Short course metres (25 m pool)

Legend: sf – semifinal

Records

World junior records

Long course metres (50 m pool)

References

External links
 

 
 
 

2000 births
Living people
Russian male freestyle swimmers
Russian male butterfly swimmers
Swimmers at the 2018 Summer Youth Olympics
Youth Olympic gold medalists for Russia
Universiade bronze medalists for Russia
Medalists at the FINA World Swimming Championships (25 m)
21st-century Russian people
Universiade medalists in swimming
Medalists at the 2019 Summer Universiade